Anna Michalak is an American geophysicist who is Director of the Department of Global Ecology at the Carnegie Institution for Science and a professor at Stanford University. Her research considers the cycling and emission of greenhouse gases. She is the lead author of the carbon cycle science plan, a comprehensive analysis of Earth's carbon stocks and flows. She was awarded the 2021 American Geophysical Union Joanne Simpson Medal.

Early life and education 
Michalak was an undergraduate student at the University of Guelph, where she majored in environmental engineering. She moved to Stanford University for graduate studies, where she earned both her master's and doctoral degrees. Her PhD research considered Bayesian inference methods to model contaminant sources.

In the early days of her scientific career, Michalak developed approaches to quantify greenhouse gas emissions. This allowed her to identify how climate change impacts plants' ability to store carbon. After graduating, Michalak joined the National Oceanic and Atmospheric Administration as a postdoctoral fellow in climate monitoring.

Research and career 
Michalak was appointed to the faculty at the University of Michigan. She joined the faculty at the Carnegie Institution for Science in 2005 and was made Director in 2020. 

Michalak's research considers planet Earth's cycles of greenhouse gases and primarily makes use of atmospheric observations. She uses these observations to better inform climate models, for example her efforts show that during the growing season, farms in the Midwestern United States are removing considerably more carbon dioxide from the atmosphere than expected. Whilst drought dominates the research into carbon accounting, Michalak has shown that floods may be more important than droughts. This is because they suppress rates of photosynthesis, the process by which plants take up carbon dioxide from the atmosphere. She is interested in climate change and how humans have impacted fresh and coastal water quality. She has shown how changes in rainfall patterns can act to exacerbate harmful blooms of algae. 

Michalak is committed climate policy and building a more robust scientific community. Michalak is the lead author of the U.S. Carbon Cycle Science Plan, which includes a detailed description of the carbon stocks and flows on planet Earth. The plan outlines a series of recommendations, including the needs to strengthen networks of observation to monitor and track carbon, develop numerical models to better predict future behaviour and train researchers to better communicate their findings with policy makers and the general public.

Awards and honors 
 American Geophysical Union Simpson Medal
 Leopold Leadership Fellow
 University of Michigan Henry Russel Lecturer
 Presidential Early Career Award for Scientists and Engineers

Selected publications

References 

American geophysicists

Women geophysicists

Living people

Year of birth missing (living people)